Valencia Municipality may refer to:
 Valencia, Córdoba, Colombia
 Valencia, Bohol, Philippines
 Valencia, Negros Oriental, Philippines
 Valencia Municipality, Carabobo, Venezuela

Municipality name disambiguation pages